Capo Testa Lighthouse is an active lighthouse located on a promontory, which is the northernmost point of Sardinia, and represents the western entrance to the Strait of Bonifacio. Cape Testa promontory is connected to the mainland by an isthmus and the structure is situated in the municipality of Santa Teresa di Gallura on the Sea of Sardinia.

Description
The tower and the building are painted white and the lantern, which mounts a Type OR T3 optics with a Focal length of 125mm, in grey metallic. The lighthouse is completely automated and managed by the Marina Militare with the identification code number 1014 E.F.

See also
 List of lighthouses in Italy
 Santa Teresa di Gallura

References

External links

 Servizio Fari Marina Militare

Lighthouses in Italy
Buildings and structures in Sardinia